The Gospel According to Judas is a 2007 novella by Jeffrey Archer and Frank Moloney which presents the events of the New Testament through the eyes of Judas Iscariot.

Reception and significance
In her book The Historical Jesus and the Literary Imagination 1860–1920, Jennifer Stevens cites The Gospel According to Judas as a recent "low" in the history of representations of Jesus in fiction, contrasted with the recent "high" of Jim Crace's novel Quarantine.

External links 
More4 News interview with Jeffery Archer the author of The Gospel According to Judas.

References

2007 British novels
Cultural depictions of Judas Iscariot
Macmillan Publishers books
British novellas